"Don't Hold Back" is the first single by the Potbelleez from the self-titled debut album The Potbelleez. The single is their most successful to date and received heavy airplay across Australia and was critically acclaimed. It has gone on to sell over 210,000 copies in Australia alone and won Most Played Dance Work of year at 2009 APRA Awards. It has featured as key advertising song for "Jeep – Don't Hold Back" in Australia.

Track listing
Australian CD single / iTunes EP
"Don't Hold Back" (Radio Edit) – (David Greene, Ilan Kidron, Jonathan Murphy, Sam Littlemore)
"Don't Hold Back" (12" Mix)
"Don't Hold Back" (Pot La More ClubDub)
"Don't Hold Back" (Drive Remix)
"Don't Hold Back" (Malente's Monster Dub)
"Don't Hold Back" (Totally Random Remix)

Charts
Don't Hold Back peaked in the Australian ARIA singles chart at number 5. It spent a total of 36 weeks inside the Australian top 50 chart, and 19 in New Zealand

End-of-year charts

Release history

In popular media
 The song is featured in the PlayStation 2 game Singstar: Hottest Hits.
 "Don't Hold Back" featured as theme song for Jeep in Australia, Korea and New Zealand.

References

2007 singles
2007 songs
APRA Award winners
Songs written by Ilan Kidron
Songs written by Sam Littlemore